The Rubber Plantation Certification Scheme is a scheme run by the Rubber Board, a statutory body under the Ministry of Commerce and Industry, a ministry of the Government of India, for granting certificates to the owners of rubber plantations showing all details of the rubber plantation. Certification of rubber plantations is a voluntary certification procedure launched by The Rubber Board in 2014.

Background

As per the section 10 of the Rubber Act, 1947 registration of rubber plantations was mandatory. However the Board discontinued the practice of registration in 1986 though the act was amended to that effect only by the Rubber Amendment Act 2009. With the discontinuation of mandatory registration, the Board resorted to structured statistical random sampling for collection of data on production, productivity, mature and immature areas, clones planted and other factors. The accuracy of data collected through random sampling has been challenged by farmers and consumers of rubber; as a result, they demanded the reintroduction of registration. The Board resolved to approach the government for reintroduction of mandatory registration. Meanwhile, optional certification of rubber plantations was launched in 2014.

Fee for certification

Rubber industry
Ministry of Commerce and Industry (India)
2014 establishments in India
Industry in India